Doto lemchei is a species of sea slug, a nudibranch, a marine gastropod mollusc in the family Dotidae.

Distribution
This species was first described from Galicia, Spain. It was subsequently reported from Britain and Ireland.

Description
This nudibranch is olive brown in colour with no dark spots on the ceratal tubercles. The tips of the tubercles appear pale or white due to white, internal, glandular cells.

EcologyDoto lemchei feeds on the hydroid Aglaophenia tuberculata'', family Aglaopheniidae.

References

Dotidae
Gastropods described in 1978